Kingston City Hall may refer to:
Kingston City Hall (New York), the city hall in Kingston, New York, United States, listed on the National Register of Historic Places
Kingston City Hall (Ontario), the city hall in Kingston, Ontario, Canada, and a National Historic Site of Canada